Rez may refer to:

Entertainment
 Rez (video game), a 2001 Japanese rail shooter music video game released by Sega
 The Rez, a 1996-1998 Canadian television drama series
 Rez (Gex), a character in the video game series Gex
 Rez, a character in Spy Kids 3-D: Game Over

Music
 "Rez" (song), a 1993 non-album track by Underworld in the UK
 Rez Band, also known as simply Rez, a former Christian heavy metal rock group from Chicago

Native Americans
 Rez, slang for an Indian reservation of United States Native Americans
 Rez, slang for an Indian reserve of Canadian First Nations peoples
 Rez dog (or reservation dog), a term for outdoor, stray, and feral dogs living on Indian reservations

People
 Rez Abbasi (born 1965), Pakistani-American fusion and jazz guitarist
 Rez Cortez (born 1956), Filipino film and television actor and assistant director
 Rez Gardi, Kurdish New Zealander international lawyer and human rights activist
 Rez Toledo, Filipino singer-songwriter
 Rezz (born Isabelle Rezazadeh; 1995), Canadian musician

Other uses
 Řež, a village in the Czech Republic
 Rez, a resource compiler for the Apple Macintosh, see ResEdit

See also
 Res (disambiguation)